The 1939–40 Detroit Red Wings season was the 14th season for the Detroit NHL franchise, eighth as the Red Wings.

Offseason

Regular season

Final standings

Record vs. opponents

Schedule and results

Playoffs

(5) Detroit Red Wings vs. (6) New York Americans

Detroit wins best-of-three series 2–1.

(3) Toronto Maple Leafs vs. (5) Detroit Red Wings

Toronto wins best-of-three series 2–0.

Player statistics

Regular season
Scoring

Goaltending

Playoffs
Scoring

Goaltending

Note: GP = Games played; G = Goals; A = Assists; Pts = Points; +/- = Plus-minus PIM = Penalty minutes; PPG = Power-play goals; SHG = Short-handed goals; GWG = Game-winning goals;
      MIN = Minutes played; W = Wins; L = Losses; T = Ties; GA = Goals against; GAA = Goals-against average;  SO = Shutouts;

Awards and records

Transactions

See also
1939–40 NHL season

References

Bibliography

External links
 

Detroit Red Wings seasons
Detroit
Detroit
Detroit Red Wings
Detroit Red Wings